The surname Rudder may refer to:

James Earl Rudder (1910–1970), United States Army major general, Texas Land 
   Commissioner, and sixteenth president of Texas A&M University.                        *David Rudder male soca musician of Trinidad and Tobago
Dale "Mister Dale" Rudder male soca musician of Barbados

John E. Rudder (born 1925), the first African-American officer in the regular US Marine Corps, in 1948
Michael Rudder (born 1950), Canadian actor
Pieter De Rudder (1822–1898), farm labourer whose healed broken leg is considered one of the most famous recognized Lourdes miracles
Samuel Rudder (c. 1726–1801), English topographer, printer and antiquarian
Scott Rudder (born 1969), American politician
Sean Rudder (born 1979), Australian former rugby league footballer